The Cameroon soft-furred mouse or Cameroon praomys (Praomys morio) is a species of rodent in the family Muridae.
It is found in Cameroon and Equatorial Guinea.
Its natural habitat is subtropical or tropical moist montane forests.
It is threatened by habitat loss.

References

 Van der Straeten, E. 2004.  Praomys morio.   2006 IUCN Red List of Threatened Species.   Downloaded on 19 July 2007.

Praomys
Mammals described in 1881
Taxonomy articles created by Polbot